The Tobacco looper (Chrysodeixis argentifera) is a moth of the family Noctuidae. It is found in Australia and New Zealand.

The wingspan is ca. 30 mm.

The larvae feed on various plants, including Sunflower, Canola, Tomato, various Beans and Silver Beet.

References

External links

species info

Plusiinae
Moths of New Zealand
Moths of Australia
Moths described in 1852